Caloplaca magnussoniana is a species of crustose lichen in the family Teloschistaceae. Found in Tasmania, Australia, it was described as new to science in 2011. The specific epithet magnussoniana honours Swedish lichenologist Adolf Hugo Magnusson.

See also
List of Caloplaca species

References

magnussoniana
Lichen species
Lichens described in 2011
Lichens of Australia
Taxa named by Ingvar Kärnefelt